Danielsville is the name of two places in the United States of America:
Danielsville, Georgia, a city in Madison County
Danielsville, Pennsylvania, a village in Northampton County